Geoffrey Charles Neal (born August 28, 1990) is an American professional mixed martial artist. He currently competes in the Welterweight division for the Ultimate Fighting Championship (UFC). As of March 7, 2023, he is #8 in the UFC welterweight rankings.

Background
Neal was born in Austin, Texas, United States. He played football at  private university Texas Lutheran. However, he did not like the football program there and transitioned to compete in MMA, coached under  Sayif Saud.

Mixed martial arts career

Early career
Neal made his amateur debut in 2010, a second-round win by knockout against Bobby Hernandez. He competed in a total of 7 amateur matches, ending with a 6–1 amateur record. Before being signed by the UFC, Neal competed in a total of 10 mixed martial arts matches, winning 8 and losing 2 of them.

Dana White's Tuesday Night Contender Series 
Neal appeared on Dana White's Contender Series 3 and faced Chase Waldon. He won the fight via technical knockout in the first round and was signed by the UFC.

Ultimate Fighting Championship
Neal made his promotional debut on February 18, 2018, against Brian Camozzi at UFC Fight Night: Cowboy vs. Medeiros. He won the bout via submission in the first round.

Neal next faced Frank Camacho on September 8, 2018, at UFC 228. He won the fight via knockout in the second round.

Neal faced Belal Muhammad on January 19, 2019, at UFC Fight Night: Cejudo vs. Dillashaw. He won the fight by unanimous decision.

Neal faced Niko Price on July 27, 2019, at UFC 240. He won the fight via technical knockout in round two. This fight earned him the Performance of the Night award.

Neal faced Mike Perry on December 14, 2019, at UFC 245. He won the fight via first-round technical knockout.

Neal was expected to face Neil Magny on August 29, 2020, at UFC Fight Night 175. However, Neal withdrew from the event due to health issues and he was replaced by Robbie Lawler.

Neal faced Stephen Thompson  on December 19, 2020, in the headliner of UFC Fight Night 183. He lost the fight via unanimous decision.

Neal faced Neil Magny at UFC on ESPN 24 on May 8, 2021. He lost the fight via unanimous decision.

Neal faced Santiago Ponzinibbio on December 11, 2021, at UFC 269. He won the back-and-forth bout via split decision. 10 out of 14 media scores gave it to Neal.

Neal faced Vicente Luque on August 6, 2022, at UFC on ESPN 40. He won the fight via knockout in round three. This win earned him the Performance of the Night award.

Neal was scheduled to face Shavkat Rakhmonov on January 14, 2023, at UFC Fight Night 217. However, on December 29, Neal pulled out due to undisclosed injury. The pair was rescheduled for UFC 285 on March 4, 2023. At the weigh-ins on March 3, Neal weighed in at 175 pounds, 4 pounds over the non-title welterweight limit. As a result, the bout proceeded as a catchweight and Neal was fined 30% of his fight purse, which went to Rakhmonov. He lost the fight via a rear-naked choke submission in the third round. Despite his failure to make weight, UFC president Dana White was so pleased with the fight and impressed with Neal's outing that Neal still received his share of the Fight of the Night award.

Championships and accomplishments
Ultimate Fighting Championship
Performance of the Night (two times) 
Fight of the Night (one time) 
MMAJunkie.com
2019 Under-the-Radar Fighter of the Year

Personal life 
Neal worked as a server at a Texas Roadhouse in Dallas for ten years until his fight with Mike Perry in late 2019. In June 2020, Neal revealed he had returned to his job as a server after failing to get fights scheduled.

In August 2020, Neal revealed he went into septic shock after suffering from an unspecified infection. Neal was admitted to the intensive care unit where it was determined he was also experiencing congestive heart and kidney failure. After taking some time to recover, Neal resumed his mixed martial arts career in December 2020.

On November 25, 2021, Neal was arrested in Collin County, Texas on charges of driving under the influence and unlawful possession of a firearm, two misdemeanors. He was later released from jail on $2,000 bond.

Mixed martial arts record

|-
|Loss
|align=center|15–5
|Shavkat Rakhmonov
|Submission (rear-naked choke)
|UFC 285
|
|align=center|3
|align=center|4:17
|Las Vegas, Nevada, United States
|
|-
|
| style="text-align:center" |15–4 
|Vicente Luque
|KO (punches)
|UFC on ESPN: Santos vs. Hill
|
| style="text-align:center" |3
| style="text-align:center" |2:01
|Las Vegas, Nevada, United States
|
|-
|Win
| style="text-align:center" | 14–4
|Santiago Ponzinibbio
|Decision (split)
|UFC 269
|
| style="text-align:center" | 3
| style="text-align:center" | 5:00
|Las Vegas, Nevada, United States
|
|-
|Loss
| style="text-align:center" | 13–4
|Neil Magny
|Decision (unanimous)
|UFC on ESPN: Rodriguez vs. Waterson
|
| style="text-align:center" | 3
| style="text-align:center" | 5:00
|Las Vegas, Nevada, United States
|
|-
|Loss
| style="text-align:center" | 13–3
|Stephen Thompson
|Decision (unanimous)
|UFC Fight Night: Thompson vs. Neal
|
| style="text-align:center" | 5
| style="text-align:center" | 5:00
|Las Vegas, Nevada, United States
|
|-
|Win
| style="text-align:center" | 13–2
|Mike Perry
|TKO (head kick and punches)
|UFC 245 
|
| style="text-align:center" | 1
| style="text-align:center" | 1:30
|Las Vegas, Nevada, United States
|
|-
|Win
| style="text-align:center" | 12–2
|Niko Price
|TKO (punches)
|UFC 240 
|
| style="text-align:center" | 2
| style="text-align:center" | 2:39
|Edmonton, Alberta, Canada
|
|-
|Win
| style="text-align:center" | 11–2
|Belal Muhammad
|Decision (unanimous)
|UFC Fight Night: Cejudo vs. Dillashaw
|
| style="text-align:center" | 3
| style="text-align:center" | 5:00
|Brooklyn, New York, United States
|
|-
|Win
| style="text-align:center" | 10–2
|Frank Camacho
|KO (head kick)
|UFC 228
|
| style="text-align:center" | 2
| style="text-align:center" | 1:23
|Dallas, Texas, United States
|
|-
|Win
| style="text-align:center" | 9–2
|Brian Camozzi
|Submission (rear-naked choke)
|UFC Fight Night: Cowboy vs. Medeiros
|
| style="text-align:center" | 1
| style="text-align:center" | 2:48
|Austin, Texas, United States
|
|-
|Win
| style="text-align:center" | 8–2
|Chase Waldon
|TKO (punches)
|Dana White's Contender Series 3
|
| style="text-align:center" | 1
| style="text-align:center" | 1:56
|Las Vegas, Nevada, United States
|
|-
|Win
| style="text-align:center" | 7–2
|Bilal Williams
|TKO (punches)
|LFA 16
|
| style="text-align:center" | 1
| style="text-align:center" | 4:43
|Dallas, Texas, United States
|
|-
|Loss
| style="text-align:center" | 6–2
|Kevin Holland
|TKO (punches)
|Xtreme Knockout 34
|
| style="text-align:center" | 3
| style="text-align:center" | 3:50
|Dallas, Texas, United States
|
|-
|Win
| style="text-align:center" | 6–1
|Ty Flores
|TKO (punches)
|Rumble Time Promotions
|
| style="text-align:center" | 1
| style="text-align:center" | 3:58
|St. Charles, Missouri, United States
|
|-
|Win
| style="text-align:center" | 5–1
|Charlie Ontiveros
|TKO (retirement)
|Legacy FC 37
|
| style="text-align:center" | 2
| style="text-align:center" | 5:00
|Houston, Texas, United States
|
|-
|Win
| style="text-align:center" | 4–1
|Christopher Anthony
|Decision (unanimous)
|Legacy FC 32
|
| style="text-align:center" | 3
| style="text-align:center" | 5:00
|Bossier City, Louisiana, United States
|
|-
|Win
| style="text-align:center" | 3–1
|Armando Servin
|Decision (unanimous)
|Xtreme Knockout 19
|
| style="text-align:center" | 3
| style="text-align:center" | 3:00
|Dallas, Texas, United States
|
|-
|Loss
| style="text-align:center" | 2–1
|Martin Sano
|Submission (rear-naked choke)
|24/7 Entertainment 9
|
| style="text-align:center" | 3
| style="text-align:center" | 1:25
|Odessa, Texas, United States
|
|-
|Win
| style="text-align:center" | 2–0
|Zack Board
|TKO (punches)
|Xtreme Knockout 17
|
| style="text-align:center" | 2
| style="text-align:center" | 1:46
|Arlington, Texas, United States
|
|-
|Win
| style="text-align:center" | 1–0
|David McAfee
|Submission (rear-naked choke)
|Xtreme Combat Productions: Blood & Glory
|
| style="text-align:center" | 1
| style="text-align:center" | 2:15
|Robstown, Texas, United States
|
|-

See also
 List of current UFC fighters
 List of male mixed martial artists

References

External links
  
 

1990 births
Welterweight mixed martial artists
Mixed martial artists utilizing Brazilian jiu-jitsu
Mixed martial artists from Texas
American male mixed martial artists
Living people
Ultimate Fighting Championship male fighters
American practitioners of Brazilian jiu-jitsu